Priyanka Phogat (born 12 May 1993) is an Indian female wrestler who won a silver medal at the 2016 Asian Wrestling Championships.

Personal life
She is the sister of Commonwealth Games gold medalist wrestler Vinesh Phogat, niece of Dronacharya Award winner Mahavir Phogat, and cousin of Commonwealth Games gold medalist wrestlers - Geeta and Babita.

Career
In 2015, Phogat bagged a seven lakh contract with the Punjab franchise of the Pro Wrestling League.

Phogat won the silver medal at the Asian Wrestling Championships in Bangkok in February 2016 in the 55 kg category. She was defeated in the gold medal bout by Mongolia's Davaasükhiin Otgontsetseg.

See also
 Phogat sisters

References

Living people
1993 births
Indian female sport wrestlers
Sportswomen from Haryana
People from Bhiwani district
Priyanka
Asian Wrestling Championships medalists
20th-century Indian women
21st-century Indian women